The Dawn: A Journal for Australian Women was an early feminist journal published monthly in Sydney, Australia between 1888 and 1905. It was first published 15 May 1888 by Louisa Lawson using the pen name of Dora Falconer. The subtitle was later changed to A Journal for the Household. It became the official publication of the Australian Federation of Women Voters.

History

Louisa Lawson left her husband in 1883 and relocated her family to Sydney. There she supported her children through various jobs, including working as a seamstress and running a boarding house. During this period she was introduced to women's suffrage. In 1887 she purchased the Republican, a journal dedicated to Australian independence and, the following year, in 1888, she founded the Dawn.

From the outset the Dawn was intended as a mouthpiece for women. In the first edition, Louisa Lawson, writing under the name of Dora Falconer, wrote:

Nevertheless, the Dawn soon hit opposition: the Dawn was produced by an all-women team of editors and printers, and this fact angered trade unionists in the New South Wales Typographical Association, in part because women were paid substantially less than men. In fighting the Dawn, the association argued that the discrepancies in pay were such that men would be unable to compete, as women would be "… able to work for half the wages a man would require to keep himself and family in comfort and respectability", as well as arguing that the work was too dangerous for women to engage in. The association attempted to boycott the publication, and at one stage a member visited their offices to "harangue the staff" – only to be removed after having had a bucket of water thrown on them by Lawson. Lawson won the battle through patience and "stern resistance" – eventually the boycott lost momentum, and the Dawn continued as it had before.

In spite of the early disputes, the Dawn proved to be successful. Lawson's ability to attract significant advertising was key to the Dawn success, (Pearce noted that up to half of the magazine was devoted to advertising), as was her efforts to promote the work: Lawson encouraged children to register subscribers by offering prizes, and ran regular competitions within the magazine to increase circulation and retain subscribers. Her efforts were to grant the Dawn a much longer life than other, contemporary, Australian feminist magazines.

The final issue of the Dawn was published in July 1905. Believing there was no-one suitable to carry on her work, Louisa Lawson "ended her paper as she started it, quite upon her own responsibility."  Her poor health, resulting from a Tram Accident and legal dispute regarding her mail bag fastener invention were key factors in her decision.

Content and themes
Lawson's working-class background was reflected in the Dawn, in that it aimed at a wider audience than the middle class. The price was low enough to appeal to those from the working classes, and the content similarly reflected this aim: as identified by Aitken, the Dawn included household hints that were "aimed at women running a home without servants". Along with those hints came editorials, articles, columns, correspondence, poetry and short stories, material for children and fashion. The Dawn was deliberately aimed at the whole household, and the political messages were interwoven with the other content.

To some extent, the Dawn existed in opposition to The Bulletin, another magazine of the period, but one aimed squarely at men – each produced radically different views of the role of men and women in society. While The Bulletin of the day has been described as depicting women as either "vain, conniving, … spendthrift [and] bent on entrapment" or as "bitter harridan[s]", the Dawn took a very different approach, depicting men in relation to home values, and arguing that the emancipation of women was necessary for the advancement of society.

The Dawn tackled a number of issues of interest to women. These included the use of corsets, female suffrage,  the overworking of women, and a woman's role within marriage. In addition, Lawson, through the pages of the Dawn, was unusual in being the only leader of the Australian women's movement who repeatedly raised the issue of spousal abuse. Within the Dawn she "offered a far-reaching critique of power relations within marriage", which was careful not to depict women as simple passive victims, but instead encouraged women to fight and escape their situation. Sheridan noted that this range of issues granted the Dawn much of its strength – Lawson did not shy away from domestic or public issues, covering both through the pages of the magazine. Cousins has further argued that not only did the Dawn construct a certain view of femininity to mount the case for female suffrage, but also one of masculinity. The Dawn presented a distinct and often unflattering view of `manhood' to their readers in an attempt to gain positions of power for women not just in the public sphere, but also within the sanctity of the domestic realm. In doing so, the writers were advocating a significant shift in the power relations that operated between men and women.

Influence
The Dawn was widely read both within Australia and internationally, and led Scott to describe Lawson as the "earliest Australian woman to be influential" within the British suffrage movement. Domestically, the success of the Dawn led to the founding of the "Dawn Club" in 1889, and the Dawn "helped to pave the way for women's magazines in Australia", validating the experiences of women, their work and their writing.

Availability
The magazine is available on microfiche in many large Australian libraries. A campaign to increase its availability by raising sufficient funds to see the Dawn digitised by the National Library of Australia was launched in 2011 by Donna Benjamin. The campaign succeeded, raising sufficient funds prior to the end of International Women's Day 2011 to enable the digital version to become available on International Women's Day 2012.

Bibliography
Patricia Clarke Pen Portraits (1988) Allen & Unwin 
Olive Lawson The First Voice of Australian Feminism (1990) Simon & Schuster

See also
List of newspapers in New South Wales

Footnotes

References

External links 
 The Dawn at Trove
 Digitise the Dawn
Selected Lead Articles from "The Dawn" at Project Gutenberg Australia

1888 establishments in Australia
1905 disestablishments in Australia
Monthly magazines published in Australia
Women's magazines published in Australia
Defunct magazines published in Australia
English-language magazines
Feminism in Australia
Feminist magazines
Magazines established in 1888
Magazines disestablished in 1905
Magazines published in Sydney